"Furniture" is a song by Amy Studt which was released as a digital download single on December 3, 2007. It is Studt's first single released on the 19 Entertainment record label. It is taken from her forthcoming album My Paper Made Men. This was a download only single and was therefore unable to chart on the UK Singles Chart.

Furniture is about a woman becoming an ornament to her partner. “There comes a point where you’re constantly together, but you may as well not have been there,” Studt explains. “You have your uses – you cook, you clean and someone has sex with you – and you just become part of the furniture.”

Track listing

"Furniture" - 3:40
"Sad, Sad World" - 4:28

Music video

There are two official music videos. The first one is a simple one of Studt wet and is shown with make-up running down her face in a bathroom. The second one was produced by Lee Lennox and shows Studt in a picture frame. The picture seems to be floating in the air for the whole song with cuts of various other pictures in the video through an old house.

The first music video has been viewed over 38,000 times on YouTube, and the animated one has been seen over 18,000 times.

References

Amy Studt songs
2007 singles
2007 songs
19 Recordings singles
Songs written by Amy Studt